Clinical Genitourinary Cancer is a peer-reviewed medical journal published by Elsevier, and previously by CIG Media Group (Cancer Information Group). The journal publishes articles on detection, diagnosis, prevention, and treatment of genitourinary cancers. The main emphasis is on recent scientific developments in all areas related to genitourinary cancers. The journal was previously published as Clinical Prostate Cancer through September 2005.

Abstracting and indexing
Clinical Genitourinary Cancer indexed in Index Medicus/PubMed, EMBASE Excerpta Medica, ISI Current Contents, CINAHL (Cumulative Index to Nursing and Allied Health Literature), Chemical Abstracts, and Journal Citation Reports.

Article types 
The journal publishes Review, Perspective, Original Study, and Case Series.

External links 
 Clinical Genitourinary Cancer
 Clinical Genitourinary Cancer at ScienceDirect

Oncology journals
Publications established in 2002
English-language journals
2002 establishments in the United States
Prostate cancer